Zambrzyków may refer to the following places in Poland:

Nowy Zambrzyków
Stary Zambrzyków